"Roustabout" is a song written by Bernie Baum, Bill Giant and Florence Kaye for Elvis Presley and the 1964 Paramount picture Roustabout. The song also appeared on the soundtrack album for the movie.

Composition 
The song written by Bernie Baum, Bill Giant and Florence Kaye was chosen as a last-minute replacement for the song written as the title track for the movie Roustabout by Otis Blackwell and Winfield Scott.

Mike Eder describes "Roustabout" as "geeky, with abysmal lyrics and a generic backing". On the other hand, the song originally intended as the title track was, in his opinion, "a respectable rocker" and a surpringly "great song for the period".

The Elvis Presley official website recounts:

(In fact, the song "Roustabout" was released as a promotional single.)

Recording 
According to the Elvis Presley official website, the backing track was recorded on April 29, 1964, at Radio Recorders, Hollywood. The session featured Billy Strange and Tiny Timbrell on guitar, Ray Siegel on bass, Hal Blaine and Bernie Mattinson on drums, Dudley Brooks on piano and The Mello Men on vocals. Presley recorded his vocals on May 14, 1964.

According to Mike Eder's Elvis Music FAQ, the song was recorded on March 3, 1964.

Track listing

Charts

References 

1964 songs
1964 singles
Elvis Presley songs
RCA Records singles
Songs written by Bernie Baum
Songs written by Bill Giant
Songs written by Florence Kaye